Gilbert's Cabin is in North Cascades National Park, in the U.S. state of Washington. Constructed by a private citizen named Gilbert Landre, the cabin was intended for as a private residence and is located at the site where Landre may have built an earlier cabin in 1888. Uniquely, the cabin walls are held together with dovetail joints at the corners, and Gilbert's Cabin is the only building in North Cascades National Park constructed in such a manner. Gilbert's Cabin was placed on the National Register of Historic Places in 1989.

References

Houses on the National Register of Historic Places in Washington (state)
Houses completed in 1894
Buildings and structures in Skagit County, Washington
National Register of Historic Places in North Cascades National Park
National Register of Historic Places in Skagit County, Washington